The Tierney Baronetcy, of Brighthelmstone in the County of Sussex and of Dover Street in the County of Middlesex, was a title that was created twice in the Baronetage of the United Kingdom, both times in favour of Matthew John Tierney, Physician-in-Ordinary to George III and George IV. The first creation came on 3 October 1818, with normal remainder to the heirs male of his body. The second creation came on 5 May 1834, with remainder in default of male issue of his own to his younger brother Edward Tierney, Dublin, then crown solicitor for Ireland, and the heirs male of his body. The 1818 creation became extinct on Tierney's death in 1845 while he was succeeded in the 1834 creation according to the special remainder by his brother, the second Baronet.

The 1834 creation became extinct on the death of the third Baronet in 1860.

Tierney baronets, of Brighthelmstone and of Dover Street (1818; First creation)
Sir Matthew John Tierney, 1st Baronet (1776–1845)

Tierney baronets, of Brighthelmstone and of Dover Street (1834; Second creation)
Sir Matthew John Tierney, 1st Baronet (1776–1845)
Sir Edward Tierney, 2nd Baronet (1780–1856)
Sir Matthew Edward Tierney, 3rd Baronet (1818–1860)

References

Extinct baronetcies in the Baronetage of the United Kingdom
Baronetcies created with special remainders